Gianni Iorio (born March 9, 1972), is an Italian bandoneón player who performs all over the world.

Discography

 Astor's Mood (Realsound 2002)
 A night in Vienna for Astor Piazzolla "Live Album" (Philology 2005)
 Tango Mediterraneo (Jazzhaus Records 2008)
 D'impulso (Jazzhaus Records 2011)
 Nocturno (Enja Records 2016)
 Mediterranean Tales (Enja Records 2020)

References

Italian musicians
Tango musicians
Bandoneonists
1972 births
Living people
People from Foggia